A national second tier of Scottish league football was established in season 1893–94, as Division Two. Until the 1921–22 season, promotion was not automatic but decided by Scottish Football League clubs on a ballot basis, thus some champion teams were able to retain the title. In the 1946–47 season it became known as the B Division before being changed back to Division Two for season 1955–56.

The second tier became known as the First Division in season 1975–76, when the top division (Division One) became the Premier Division, although its status within the Scottish football league system league system changed in 1998–99 when clubs from the top tier (Premier Division) broke away to form the Scottish Premier League. The First Division was still the second tier in the Scottish league system, but was the top level of the Scottish Football League rather than the second. The Scottish Premier League and Scottish Football League merged in 2013 to form the Scottish Professional Football League, with the second tier becoming known as the Scottish Championship.

Scottish Football League Division Two (1893–1946)

 Before 1915 clubs finishing on equal points would play-off for the title. In 1909–10 Leith Athletic and Raith Rovers both finished with 33 points but decided not to play-off for the title and were therefore declared joint Champions.

Scottish Football League Division B (1946–1955)

Scottish Football League Division Two (1955–1975)

Scottish Football League First Division (1975–2013)

Scottish Championship (2013–)

Total titles won

Clubs participating in the 2022–23 Scottish Championship are denoted in bold type.
Clubs no longer active are denoted in italics.

References
Specific

General
RSSSF – Final Tables Second Level 1894–2005
RSSSF – Scotland 2005–06
RSSSF – Scotland 2006–07
RSSSF – Scotland 2007–08
RSSSF – Scotland 2007–08

Winners
Winners
Championship winners
Winners